Bishop Demetrius Martin Greschuk (7 November 1923 in Innisfree, Alberta, Canada – 8 July 1990 in Edmonton, Canada) was a Canadian Ukrainian Greek Catholic hierarch. He served as the Titular Bishop of Nazianzus and Auxiliary Bishop of Ukrainian Catholic Eparchy of Edmonton from 27 June 1974 until 28 April 1986 and as the second Eparchial Bishop of Ukrainian Catholic Eparchy of Edmonton from 28 April 1986 until his death on 8 July 1990.

Life
Bishop Greschuk was born in the family of ethnical Ukrainian Greek-Catholics in Canada. After the school education, he subsequently studied philosophy and theology in the St. Augustine Theological Seminary in Toronto. Greschuk was ordained as a priest on June 11, 1950 after completed theological studies.

After that he had a various pastoral assignments and served as parish priest in the different parishes of his native Ukrainian Catholic Eparchy of Edmonton.

On June 27, 1974, Fr. Greschuk was nominated by Pope Paul VI and on October 3, 1974 consecrated to the Episcopate as the Titular Bishop of Nazianzus and Auxiliary Bishop of Ukrainian Catholic Eparchy of Edmonton. The principal consecrator was Bishop Neil Savaryn. Bishop Greschuk died on July 8, 1990 in the age 66.

References

1923 births
1990 deaths
People from the County of Minburn No. 27
Canadian Eastern Catholic bishops
20th-century Eastern Catholic bishops
Bishops of the Ukrainian Greek Catholic Church
Canadian members of the Ukrainian Greek Catholic Church
Canadian people of Ukrainian descent
Soviet emigrants to Canada